Kanakapura Assembly constituency is one of the 224 assembly constituencies in Karnataka state in India. The constituency is one of the 8 seats which make up Bangalore Rural (Lok Sabha constituency). Ramakrishna Hegde contested a bypoll from this seat when he first became Chief Minister in 1983.

Assembly Members 
Source:

Election results

2018 Election

2013 Election

2008 Election

1985 Election
 P.G.R. Sindhia (JNP) : 53,669  
 M. V. Rajashekaran (INC) : 26,534

1983 bypoll
 Ramakrishna Hegde (Janata Party's sitting CM) defeated Linge Gowda of Congress(I) by 23,156 votes

1983 Election
 P.G.R. Sindhia (JNP) : 37,467 votes  
 C. Appaji (INC) : 24,603

1978 Election
 Appaji C. (Congress - Indira) : 30,883 votes 
 Srinivasa Murthy K.G (JNP) : 27,590

1962 Election
 S. Kariyappa (IND) : 21,085 votes 
 K. G. Thimme Gowda (INC) : 19,492

1957 Election
 M. Linge Gowda (IND) : 15,624 votes 
 K. G. Thimme Gowda (INC) : 11,459

References

Assembly constituencies of Karnataka